SS Empire Metal was the name of two steamships in the service of the British Government.

 , built by Furness Shipbuilding Company, and launched as Empire Metal in 1941.
 , built by Harland & Wolff Ltd. Sunk at Bône, Algeria on 2 January 1943.

Ship names